The Dinka tribe are a Nilotic ethnic group native to South Sudan with a sizable diaspora population abroad. The Dinka mostly live along the Nile, from Jonglei to Renk, in the region of Bahr el Ghazal, Upper Nile (two out of three Provinces which were formerly located in southern Sudan), and the Abyei Area of the Ngok Dinka in South Sudan.

They number around 4.5 million people according to the 2008 Sudan census, constituting about 18% of the population of the entire country and the largest ethnic tribe in South Sudan. Dinka are noted for their height, and, along with the Tutsi of Rwanda, they are believed to be the tallest people in Africa. However, it seems that the stature of today's Dinka males is lower, possibly as a consequence of undernutrition and conflicts. Other studies of comparative historical height data and nutrition place the Dinka as the tallest people in the world.

The Dinka people have no centralised political authority, instead comprising many independent but interlinked clans. Some of those clans traditionally provide ritual chiefs, known as the "masters of the fishing spear" or beny bith, who provide leadership for the entire people and appear to be at least in part hereditary.

History

History

According to oral traditions, the Dinka originated from the Gezira in what is now Sudan. In medieval times this region was ruled by the kingdom of Alodia, a Christian, multi-ethnic empire dominated by Nubians. Living in its southern periphery and interacting with the Nubians, the Dinka absorbed a sizable amount of the Nubian vocabulary. From the 13th century, with the disintegration of Alodia, the Dinka began to migrate out of the Gezira, fleeing slave raids and other military conflicts as well as droughts.

Conflict over pastures and cattle raids has been happening between Dinka and Nuer as they battled for grazing their animals.

As part of Sudan
The Dinka's religions, beliefs and lifestyle have led to conflict with the Arab Muslim government in Khartoum. The Sudan People's Liberation Army, led by the late Dr. John Garang De Mabior, a Dinka, took arms against the government in 1983. During the subsequent 21-year civil war, many thousands of Dinka, along with non-Dinka fellow southerners, were massacred by government forces. Since the independence of South Sudan, the Dinka, led by Salva Kiir Mayardit, have also engaged in a civil war with the Nuer and other groups, who accuse them of monopolising power.

Christianity 
In 1983, due to Sudan's second civil war, many young educated Dinka men and women were forced to flee from the cities where they were working back to rural  villages. Some of these men were Christians who had been converted by the Church Missionary Society and they took their faith with them when they fled. Among these men and women were ordained clergymen who began preaching in the villages. Song and praises were used to teach the mostly illiterate Dinka about the faith and Biblical lessons. A large number of Dinka people have converted to Christianity and are learning how to adapt or reject ancient religious practices and rituals to match Christian teachings. The Christian conversion of the Dinka people did not only happen in the rural villages but also among Dinka refugees as they fled the war-torn country. The Lost Boys of Sudan were converted in great numbers in the refugee camps of Ethiopia.

Dinka massacre
On November 15, 1991, the event known as the "Dinkas Massacre" commenced in South Sudan. Forces led by the breakaway faction of Riek Machar deliberately killed an estimated 200,000 civilians of Dinka Bor, Dinka Twic East, Dinka Nyarweng, and Dinka Hol in villages and wounded several thousand more over the course of two months. Much of their wealth was destroyed, which led to mass death due to hunger. It is estimated that 100,000 people left the area following the attack.

Pastoral strategies

Southern Sudan has been described as "a large basin gently sloping northward", through which flow the Bahr el Jebel River, the (White Nile), the Bahr el Ghazal (Nam) River and its tributaries, and the Sobat, all merging into a vast barrier swamp.

Vast Sudanese oil areas to the south and east are part of the flood plain, a basin in southern Sudan into which the rivers of Congo, Uganda, Kenya, and Ethiopia drain off from an ironstone plateau that belts the regions of Bahr El Ghazal and Upper Nile.

The terrain can be divided into four land classes:
 Highlands: higher than the surrounding plains by only a few centimeters; are the sites for “permanent settlements”. Vegetation consists of open thorn woodland and/or open mixed woodland with grasses.
 Intermediate Lands: lie slightly below the highlands, commonly subject to flooding from heavy rainfall in the Ethiopian and East/Central African highlands; Vegetation is mostly open perennial grassland with some acacia woodland and other sparsely distributed trees.
 Toic: land seasonally inundated or saturated by the main rivers and inland water courses, retaining enough moisture throughout the dry season to support cattle grazing.

Ecology of the large basin is unique; until recently, wild animals and birds flourished, hunted rarely by the agro-pastoralists.

The Dinka's migrations are determined by the local climate, and their agro-pastoral lifestyle responding to the periodic flooding and dryness of the area in which they live. They begin moving around May–June at the onset of the rainy season to their “permanent settlements” of mud and thatch housing above flood level, where they plant their crops of millet and other grain products. These rainy season settlements usually contain other permanent structures such as cattle byres (luak) and granaries. The cultivation of sorghum, millet, and other crops begins in the highlands in the early rainy season and the harvest of crops begins when the rains are heavy in June–August.

Dinka tribes
The number of Dinka sub-divisions is hotly contested as the border or line between group, sub-division, and sections is blurred and often difficult to determine. For example, one can divide the Atuot into Apak and Reel, Bor, Twic, Nyarweng and Ho l and Panaruu into Awet and Kuel and Ciec into Ador and Lou, where Ador and Lou are sub-divided into Ciec Manyiel (Jieng).

Rek people
The Rek are an ethnic group in South Sudan, a subgroup of the Dinka. Its members speak South-Western Dinka, also called Rek, a Nilotic language. Many members of this ethnicity are Christians. Some estimates put the Rek population at or exceeding 500,000 people.

Cultural and religious beliefs

The Dinkas' pastoral lifestyle is also reflected in their religious beliefs and practices. The Dinka religion, just like most other Nilotic faiths, are Polytheistic, but have one creator God, Nhialic, who leads the Dinka pantheon of gods and spirits. He is generally distant to humans and does not directly interact with them. The sacrificing of oxen by the "masters of the fishing spear" is a central component of Dinka's religious practice. Age is an important factor in Dinka culture, with young men being inducted into adulthood through an initiation ordeal that includes marking the forehead with a sharp object. Also during this ceremony, they acquire a second cow-color name. The Dinka believe they derive religious power from nature and the world around them, rather than from a religious tome.

Dinka diaspora
The experience of Dinka refugees was portrayed in the documentary movies Lost Boys of Sudan by Megan Mylan and Jon Shenk and God Grew Tired Of Us, Joan Hechts' book The Journey of the Lost Boys and the fictionalized autobiography of a Dinka refugee, Dave Eggers' What Is the What: The Autobiography of Valentino Achak Deng. Other books on and by the Lost Boys include The Lost Boys of Sudan by Mark Bixler, God Grew Tired of Us by John Bul Dau, They Poured Fire On Us From The Sky by Alephonsion Deng, Benson Deng, and Benjamin Ajak and A Long Walk to Water by Linda Sue Park. In 2004 the first volume of the graphic novel Echoes of the Lost Boys of Sudan was released in Dallas, Texas.

Notable Dinka

 William Deng Nhial, a political leader of Sudan African National Union, SANU and co-founder of Anya Anya military wing of the liberation of Southern Sudan
 Abel Alier, known as "Abel Alier Kwai", the first southerner former president of the High Executive Council of Southern Sudan and Vice President of Sudan (1972-1982).
 Hussein Abdelbagi, one of the Vice Presidents of the Republic of South Sudan.
 Deng Adut, defence lawyer and former child soldier
 Aliir Aliir, Australian Rules Footballer
 Mathiang Yak Anek, 19th-century female chief and escaped slave
 Adut Bulgak, First South Sudanese WNBA player, 2016 draft
 George Athor, Sudan People's Liberation Army lieutenant general and an SPLA dissident 
 Francis Bok, author
 Manute Bol, deceased former NBA player, one of the two tallest players in the league's history
 Bol Bol, current NBA player, son of Manute Bol
 Wenyen Gabriel, NBA Player
 John Bul Dau also known as Dhieu Deng Leek, one of the "Lost Boys of Sudan", author of God Grew Tired of Us, his autobiography, and subject of the documentary of the same title
 Majak Daw, Australian Rules Footballer
 Majak Mawith, Soccer player
 Rebecca Nyandeng De Mabior, Vice President of South Sudan
 Aldo Deng, former Sudanese cabinet member and current South Sudanese statesman; father of Luol Deng
 Ataui Deng, fashion model and niece of Alek Wek
 Lt. General Dominic Dim Deng, South Sudan's first political officer of SPLA, Minister for SPLA Affairs
 Francis Deng, author, SAIS research professor
 Luol Deng, former NBA player
 Valentino Achak Deng, a former Lost Boy and subject of What Is the What: The Autobiography of Valentino Achak Deng, a biographical novel written by Dave Eggers
 Salva Dut, a former Lost Boy, the inspiration of the book A Long Walk to Water by Linda Sue Park
 John Garang, former First Vice President of Sudan, Commander in Chief of Sudan People's Liberation Army and Chairman of Sudan People's Liberation Movement.
 Dr. Achol Marial Deng, Former Secretariat of Health, Sudan People's Liberation Movement.
 Awer Mabil, current football player
 Achol Jok Mach, peace activist and podcaster
 Ater Majok, former NBA player
 Thon Maker, current NBA player
 Guor Marial, Olympic marathon runner
 Salva Kiir Mayardit, First President of the Republic of South Sudan, Commander in Chief of Sudan People's Liberation Army, and Chairman of Sudan People's Liberation Movement
 Marial Shayok, current NBA player
 Alek Wek, fashion model
 Grace Bol, fashion model
 Adut Akech, fashion model
 Mathiang Mathiang
 Thomas Deng, current football player 
 Tokmac Nguen
 Stephen Dhieu Dau, former Minister of Finance and Planning of the Republic of South Sudan and SPLM member 
 Chok Dau, current football player  
 Arkanjelo Athian Teng, an anti-corruption leader, the former deputy governor of NBG 2009
 Denis Zakaria
Qevinz

Dinka tribal groups
This is a list of Dinka tribal grouping by region. Note that these divisions are further divided into several subdivisions, for example, Dinka Rek is subdivided into Aguok, Kuac, and many other things, but they speak the same language; only the pronunciation is slightly different.

Dinka Agar - (Lakes State), Barh El Ghazal
Aliab Dinka - (Lakes State), Barh El Ghazal
Dinka Twic - (Warrap State), Barh El Ghazal
Dinka Rek - (Warrap State, and parts of NBG and Western Barh El Ghazal), Barh El Ghazal
Dinka Malual - (NBG), Barh El Ghazal
Dinka Ngok - (Abiey), Barh El Ghazal
Dinka Padang - (Unity State), Upper Nile
Dinka Bor - (Bor), Jonglei
Dinka Twic, Jonglei
Dinka Nyarweng, Jonglei
Dinka Hol, Jonglei 
Ruweng - (Unity State), Upper Nile
Dongjol use malakal area for cattle keeping place - (Jonglei state, Upper Nile: Dinka Twic East, Dinka Nyarweng, Dinka Hol and Dinka Bor.

There are no Dinka tribes in the region of Equatorial, hence Dinka are located in the regions of Bahr El Ghazal and Upper Nile respectively.

Food Habits
Men and women eat meals separately. When milk supply is low, children will get priority. Children are breastfed until 2-3 years of age, augmented by cow's milk from 9-12 months. Children will start eating solid food (porridge), after about one year. After children turn three, they eat two meals a day. Adults also eat two meals a day.

See also
Sudanese nomadic conflicts
Conflict between Dinka and Nuer in South Sudan

References

Further reading
 
 
 
 
 The Power of Creative Reasoning: The Ideas and Vision of Dr John Garang by Lual A Den

External links

 
 

 
Ethnic groups in Sudan
Ethnic groups in South Sudan
Nilotic peoples
Pastoralists